The Economic Cooperation Administration (ECA) was a U.S. government agency set up in 1948 to administer the Marshall Plan. It reported to both the State Department and the Department of Commerce. The agency's first head was Paul G. Hoffman, a former leader of car manufacturer Studebaker; he was succeeded by William Chapman Foster in 1950. The rest of the organization was also headed by major business figures such as Arthur A. Kimball (who was a key contributor to the ECA's founding) as well as David K.E. Bruce (who worked at the Office of Strategic Services in Europe during World War II).

The ECA had an office in the capital of each of the 16 countries participating in the Marshall Plan. In theory the ECA served as joint administrator of the Marshall Plan development projects in each European country. In practice, local officials knew far more about what was needed than ECA representatives, who developed a management strategy of listening to local officials and allowed them to set priorities for reconstruction assistance.

It was succeeded by the Mutual Security Agency in 1951, one of the predecessor to the United States Agency for International Development.

References

External links

Records of U.S. Foreign Assistance Agencies in the National Archives
Documents authored or sponsored by ECA available from the USAID Development Experience Clearinghouse (USAID/DEC)
Albert H. Huntington Jr. (ECA Staff Member), Collection of Documents Related to Foreign Aid, Dwight D. Eisenhower Presidential Library

Aftermath of World War II in the United States
Defunct agencies of the United States government